The  is an archaeological site in the Nakagawa neighborhood of Tsuzuki-ku, Yokohama, Kanagawa Prefecture, in the southern Kantō region of Japan containing a Yayoi period settlement trace. The site was designated a National Historic Site in 1986.

Overview
The Ōtsuka-Saikachido Site is located on the Shimosueyoshi plateau in the northern suburbs of the city of Yokohama, and was discovered in 1972 in conjunction with land development for the Kōhoku New Town development. The site is in two parts. The Ōtsuka ruins consist of the traces of a  large-scale moated settlement dating around the middle of the Yayoi period, or approximately 2000 years ago. The adjacent Saikachido ruins consist of a Yayoi period necropolis with square-shaped tombs. The Ōtsuka site was extensively excavated from 1973, revealing the outlines of the entire village, which covered an area of about 20,000 square meters. It was surrounded by a moat with a circumference of 600 meters, a width of four meters and a depth of 1.5 to two meters. Within this enclosure, the foundations of at least 90 pit dwellings and ten stilt-type buildings were discovered, along with a large amount of Yayoi pottery, stone tools, and carbonized rice. From the amount of carbonized rice, it is assumed that the settlement was destroyed by fire. The Saikachido site was excavated in 1972, and 25 tombs were found in total. The style of the tumulus is called the "square-girder type" and consists of a low square earthen burial mound with a grooved moat on all sides, containing a wooden casket. 

Despite the rarity of a complete Yayoi period settlement ruin and its National Historic Site designation, only the eastern third of the site was preserved, with the remainder destroyed by subsequent land development. On the Ōtsuka site, 27 pit dwellings were preserved, of which seven have been restored, along with one reconstructed stilt granary, a wooden bridge and a 250 meter long section of the moat. In the Saikachido site, five of the tombs have been restored and preserved. Currently, the site is integrated with the Yokohama History Museum as an archaeological park. It is located about eight minutes on foot from the Yokohama Municipal Subway Center-Kita Station.

Gallery

See also

List of Historic Sites of Japan (Kanagawa)

References

External links

Yokohama History Museum home page 

Archaeological sites in Japan
Yayoi period
Parks and gardens in Yokohama
History of Kanagawa Prefecture
Historic Sites of Japan